Marion Ames Taggart (1866-1945) was an American writer of verses, stories, and Catholic literature.

Taggart wrote for many secular and Catholic publications, and most of her writing was for children.

Biography
Marion Ames Taggart was born in Haverhill, Massachusetts. She was descended on the mother's side from English Puritans. Her great grandfather was Captain Benjamin Ames of Bunker Hill. The Taggarts, originally MacTaggarts, came from Scotland to New Hampshire five generations earlier. Taggart was unable to attend a school due to ill health. Except for languages and music, her mother provided for her education. At the age of 10, she learned more about the claims of rival religious sects and tried to discover which possessed the truth. In her teens, she began to study Catholic teaching, and was baptised in Boston. Her father was Catholic and her mother converted to Catholicism. Taggart began to write verses and stories at the age of 13. Except for a few which appeared in newspapers, nothing was published until she contributed regularly to The Young Catholic while still under the age of 20. She wrote for many secular and Catholic publications, and most of her writing was for children. She is known to have lived with her mother at Plainfield, New Jersey.

Works 

 The Blissylvania Post-Office (1897)
 Winnetou, The Apache Knight (1898)
 The Wyndham Girls (1902)
 The Little Grey House (1904)
 The Little Women Club (1905)
 Six Girls and Bob: A Story of Patty-Pans and Green Fields (1906)
 The Daughters of the Little Grey House (1907)
 Six Girls and the Tea Room (1907)
 Six Girls Growing Older: A Story" (1908)
 Six Girls and the Seventh One" (1909)
 Betty Gaston, The Seventh Girl: A Story(1910)
 Six Girls and Betty: A Story (1911)
 Six Girls Grown Up: A Story (1912)
 Beth's Wonder-Winter: A Story (1914)
 Beth's Old Home(1915)
 Beth of Old Chilton (1916)
 A Pilgrim Maid: A Story of Plymouth Colony in 1620  (1920)

References

External links

 Catalogue of online books by Marion Ames Taggart, from The Online Books Page

 
 

1866 births
1945 deaths
American religious writers
Women religious writers
American women children's writers
American children's writers
People from Haverhill, Massachusetts
American women non-fiction writers
Catholics from Massachusetts